Rich's was a family-owned business that was established in 1962, grew out of Jerry's Army Navy Surplus in Salem, Massachusetts, USA.  The Rich family once operated 29 stores in Maine, New Hampshire, Vermont and Massachusetts, which offered discounted merchandise.

History
Jerry Rich, a Russian immigrant living in Salem, Massachusetts, established Jerry's Army-Navy Surplus in 1929. Rich's was founded in 1961 by Rich, his sons and his son-in-law. Similar to chain stores like Ames and Bradlee's, the chain offered discounted brand-name merchandise.
At its peak, the business operated 29 locations across New England. In 1994, the company had sales of $240 million.  Due to retail consolidation and pressure from Walmart, the chain went bankrupt on March 14, 1996. Financial records in its bankruptcy filing detailed $63.4 million in assets and $51.3 million in liabilities. While the business was initially optimistic about its ability to emerge from bankruptcy, the store would shutter all its locations in December 1996. Nearly 2,000 workers at the company's 28 stores in Massachusetts, Maine, New Hampshire, and Vermont lost their jobs by February 1997.

References

External links
 Discounters from Woolworth to Wal-Mart

Retail companies established in 1962
Defunct discount stores of the United States
Surplus stores
Retail companies disestablished in 1997
1962 establishments in Massachusetts
1997 disestablishments in Massachusetts
Companies based in Salem, Massachusetts